Irina Bara was the defending champion, but lost in the second round to Paula Badosa Gibert.

Badosa Gibert went on to win the title, defeating Aliona Bolsova Zadoinov in the final, 6–1, 4–6, 6–2.

Seeds

Draw

Finals

Top half

Bottom half

References
Main Draw

BBVA Open Ciudad de Valencia - Singles